"(Feels Like a) Summer's Night" is a song written by Jimmy Manzie and recorded by Australian band Ol' 55. The song was released in March 1978 as the second single from the band's third studio album, Cruisin' for a Bruising (1978). The song peaked at number 50 on the Australian Kent Music Report.

Track listing
 7" (K-6936)
Side A	"(Feels Like a) Summer's Night" - 3:58
Side B "He's Gotta Go" - 2:31

Charts

References

1977 songs
1978 singles
Ol' 55 (band) songs
Mushroom Records singles
Songs written by Jimmy Manzie